John Franklin "Frank" Sergent (December 6, 1868 – December 14, 1956) was an American Republican politician who served in the Virginia Senate from 1922 to 1924.

References

External links
 
 

1868 births
1956 deaths
Republican Party Virginia state senators
People from Scott County, Virginia
Milligan University alumni
20th-century American politicians